Parkinsonia is a genus of ammonites belonging to the family Parkinsoniidae.

These fast-moving nektonic carnivores lived from the Bajocian age to the Bathonian age of the Middle Jurassic.

Description
Parkinsonia species have a compressed spiral shell with strong ribbing.

Distribution
Fossils of species within this genus have been found in the Jurassic of France, Germany, Iran, Russia, United Kingdom, and United States.

References

Middle Jurassic ammonites of North America
Middle Jurassic ammonites of Asia
Middle Jurassic ammonites of Europe
Ammonitida genera
Perisphinctoidea